Westbrook is a suburb in the city of Palmerston North, New Zealand.

The semi-rural suburb includes the Olive Tree Village, the Manawatu Trotting Club, and several parks and reserves: Bill Brown Park, David Spring Park, Kimberley Park, Ashton Reserve, Amberley Reserve, Chippendale Reserve, Chelmarsh Reserve, Marybank Reserve, Dalfield Reserve, and part of the Kawau Stream Reserve.

Demographics

It had a population of 3,261 at the 2018 New Zealand census, an increase of 258 people (8.6%) since the 2013 census, and an increase of 222 people (7.3%) since the 2006 census. There were 1,101 households. There were 1,587 males and 1,671 females, giving a sex ratio of 0.95 males per female, with 789 people (24.2%) aged under 15 years, 792 (24.3%) aged 15 to 29, 1,275 (39.1%) aged 30 to 64, and 405 (12.4%) aged 65 or older.

Ethnicities were 69.6% European/Pākehā, 31.3% Māori, 12.2% Pacific peoples, 6.3% Asian, and 2.1% other ethnicities (totals add to more than 100% since people could identify with multiple ethnicities).

The proportion of people born overseas was 12.5%, compared with 27.1% nationally.

Although some people objected to giving their religion, 51.3% had no religion, 33.6% were Christian, 1.1% were Hindu, 0.9% were Muslim, 0.7% were Buddhist and 4.3% had other religions.

Of those at least 15 years old, 285 (11.5%) people had a bachelor or higher degree, and 606 (24.5%) people had no formal qualifications. The employment status of those at least 15 was that 1,173 (47.5%) people were employed full-time, 318 (12.9%) were part-time, and 162 (6.6%) were unemployed.

Education

References

Suburbs of Palmerston North
Populated places in Manawatū-Whanganui